The 1964 Detroit Lions season was the 31st in Detroit and the 35th in franchise history. They finished at 7–5–2, fourth in the Western conference.

Offseason 
 On January 21, William Clay Ford, Lions president since 1961, purchased the team.
 On March 16, Lions Defensive Tackle Alex Karras was reinstated by Pete Rozelle after being suspended for betting.

NFL Draft

Regular season 

For the first time since 1950, the Green Bay Packers were not the guest on Thanksgiving Day; they visited Tiger Stadium in late September for a rare Monday night game.

Schedule 

 Saturday night (September 19), Monday night (September 28),Thursday (November 26: Thanksgiving)

Game summaries

Week 1

Week 10: at Cleveland Browns

Standings

Roster

Awards and records 
 Terry Barr, Outstanding Lineman, Pro Bowl

References 

 Detroit Lions on Pro Football Reference
 Detroit Lions on jt-sw.com
 Detroit Lions on The Football Database

Detroit Lions
Detroit Lions seasons
Detroit Lions